Andreas L. Paulus (born 30 August 1968) is a German jurist who has been serving as a Judge on the Federal Constitutional Court of Germany since 2010. He held the chair of general international law at the University of Göttingen. His research interests include international law, humanitarian law, and constitutional law.

Career
Paulus attended the University of Göttingen, University of Geneva, Ludwig Maximilian University of Munich, and Harvard University. He received his first Staatsexamen in 1994, his second in 1996. In 2000, Paulus completed his doctoral thesis on "" (The International Community in Public International Law) under the supervision of Bruno Simma at the University of Munich. After spending the 2003/04 academic year as Visiting Assistant Professor of Law at the University of Michigan Law School, Paulus finished his Habilitation in Munich, and since 2006 holds a chair at the University of Göttingen.

On February 25, 2010, Paulus was nominated to succeed Hans-Jürgen Papier on the Federal Constitutional Court of Germany. Since March 2010 he is the successor of Papier.

Paulus was an assistant to Bruno Simma in the LaGrand case.

Notable decisions
When the Federal Constitutional Court ruled on the institutional set-up of Germany’s public broadcasting corporations in March 2014, Paulus issued a dissenting opinion arguing that it is “necessary that the supervisory bodies are generally free of representatives of the executive in order to emancipate them from state influence.”

Other activities
 Max Planck Institute for Comparative Public Law and International Law, Member of the Scientific Advisory Board (since 2013)
 Max Planck Institute for Innovation and Competition, Member of the Board of Trustees
 Minerva Center for Human Rights, Member of the International Advisory Board (since 2010)

Selected publications
.
.
.
.
.

References

External links
Andreas Paulus at the Federal Constitutional Court of Germany
Official website at the University of Göttingen

1968 births
Living people
Jurists from Bavaria
Ludwig Maximilian University of Munich alumni
University of Göttingen alumni
Harvard University alumni
University of Michigan Law School faculty
Free Democratic Party (Germany) politicians
Justices of the Federal Constitutional Court